Ectoedemia peterseni is a moth of the family Nepticulidae. It was described by Puplesis in 1985. It is known from the Russian Far East and Japan.

The larvae probably feed on Acer species.

References

Nepticulidae
Moths of Asia
Moths described in 1985